Karymsky (Karymskaya sopka) is an active stratovolcano on the Kamchatka Peninsula, Russia.  It is currently the most active volcano on the Kamchatka Peninsula, as well as the most active volcano of Kamchatka's eastern volcanic zone.

It is named after the Karyms, an ethnic group in Russia.

Description
Karymsky is a symmetrical stratovolcano rising within a 5-km-wide caldera that formed during the early Holocene. Much of the cone is mantled by lava flows less than 200 years old. Historical eruptions have been vulcanian or vulcanian-strombolian with moderate explosive activity and occasional lava flows from the summit crater. There is currently an ongoing cycle of non-stop eruption occurring, and is the peninsula's most active, and reliable volcano, which has been erupting continuously since 1996.

Eruptions

An ongoing cycle of almost continuous eruption has been occurring since 1996.

See also
 List of volcanoes in Russia
 Kamchatka Volcanic Eruption Response Team

References

External links

Active volcanoes
Volcanoes of the Kamchatka Peninsula
Mountains of the Kamchatka Peninsula
VEI-6 volcanoes
Calderas of Russia
Stratovolcanoes of Russia
Holocene stratovolcanoes
Holocene Asia